Maclean Porter (born January 14, 1995), better known by his stage name Nessly, is an American rapper known for his album Wildflower, which was released in 2018.

Biography 
He was born in New York but was raised in Georgia. He started making music from age 12. His first album Still Finessin was released in 2016. In 2017, he was nominated for the XXL Freshman.

Music 
In a feature interview with Billboard, Nessly mentions Lil Wayne, Drake and Kanye West as influences on his music. He doesn't write his lyrics in advance, explaining that "Everything is off the dome." Some of the songs on Wildflower were produced by TM88.

Nessly's 2019 album Standing on Satan's Chest was described as mixing "inventive melodies and clever punchlines atop state-of-the-art production". The album is "about overcoming adversity, judgment and circumstance", according to Nessly.

Albums 

 Still Finessin' 2016
 Solo Boy Band 2016
 Wildflower 2018
 Standing On Satan's Chest (2019)

Singles (Selected) 

 WHOHASIT (Y2K Remix) 2018
 Wolverine 2018
 Make it Right (feat. Joji) 2018
 Love You More 2019
 Prairie Fields 2019
 Foreign Sheets (feat. Lil Keed & Lil Yachty) 2019
 ASMR 2019
 Link And Build 2021
 Mythbusters 2021
 True Colors 2021
 2 Seater 2022
 High Fashion Drugs (feat. Bhavi) 2022
 Sad on Sad 2022

References 

1995 births
Living people
American male rappers
Rappers from Georgia (U.S. state)
Rappers from Brooklyn